St. Joseph's Hospital, Baramulla, is a Catholic hospital and School of Nursing situated in Baramulla, Jammu and Kashmir, India.

History 
St. Joseph Hospital was started on 21 September 1921 by Franciscan Missionaries of Mary. Franciscan Missionaries of Mary sisters came from Rawalpindi to start a hospital at the request of the Mill Hill Fathers. After setting up a temporary dispensary followed by a maternity hospital and dispensary in 1931, a full-fledged general hospital was established in 1937.

On 22 October 1947, Pashtun tribal raiders backed by Pakistan military apparatus invaded the then independent princely state of Jammu and Kashmir. They penetrated into Baramulla in the following days and went on a carnage. Six people were killed at the hospital—a British colonel and his wife, a nurse, a patient, the husband of a physician, and Sister Teresalina. According to survivors, a missionary-educated Pakistani Army officer drove the raiders out of the hospital.

In 1965, auxiliary nurse midwifery and female multi purpose health worker courses were started at the hospital.

Present 
St. Joseph's Hospital, St. Joseph's School and St. Joseph's Catholic Church share the same campus. St. Joseph Hospital is the only Christian hospital in the valley of Kashmir. It has served the valley in many ways. St. Joseph's is affiliated with the Catholic Health Association of India and Missionaries Health Services.

See also 
List of Christian mission hospitals

Notes

References

1921 establishments in India
Christian hospitals
Franciscan hospitals
Hospitals in Jammu and Kashmir
Baramulla
Catholic hospitals in Asia